CBTF Technology is the patent holder of canting keel technology used in the design of some notable racing yachts in recent years, including Wild Oats XI and Alfa Romeo.  The company licenses its canting ballast, twin foil technology to yacht designers who choose to incorporate it into their designs.

Notes

References

Companies based in San Diego
Sailboat components
Technology companies of the United States